The mixed doubles event at the 2018 South American Games was held from 30 May to 2 June.

Medalists

Draw

References

External links
Draw

Mixed doubles